A graded stakes race is a thoroughbred horse race in the United States that meets the criteria of the American Graded Stakes Committee of the Thoroughbred Owners and Breeders Association (TOBA). A specific grade level (I, II, III or listed) is then assigned to the race, based on statistical analysis of the quality of the field in previous years, provided the race meets the minimum purse criteria for the grade in question. In Canada, a similar grading system is maintained by the Jockey Club of Canada. Graded stakes races are similar to Group races in Europe but the grading is more dynamic in North America.

The grading system was designed in 1973 and first published in 1974. The original purpose of grading was to identify the most competitive races, which helps horsemen make comparisons of the relative quality of bloodstock for breeding and sales purposes. A high grading can also be used by racetracks to promote the race in question. When determining Eclipse Award winners, racing journalists will consider the number and grade of a horse's stakes wins during the year.

In general, stakes race refers to the stake, or entry fee, owners must pay, which generally forms part of the prize money offered to the top finishers. Not all stakes races are eligible for grading. Notably, races that are restricted to horses bred in a specific state (e.g., the Tiznow Stakes for California-breds) or country (e.g., the races that make up the Canadian Triple Crown, all restricted to Canadian-breds) are excluded, regardless of the purse or quality of field. Conversely, some races that are not technically stakes races (usually invitational races where entry fees are not required by the racetrack) may be eligible for grading if they meet the quality standards.

Criteria
The American Graded Stakes Committee grades only races that:
 Have a purse of at least $75,000 for a listed race, $100,000 for Grade III, $200,000 for Grade II, and $300,000 for Grade I.
 Have been run for two years under fundamentally the same conditions. (The race's distance for example may be slightly altered, but age and sex conditions may not.)
 Restrict entries only by age and sex. For example, a race may be restricted to three-year-old fillies and be eligible for grading. However, races that are restricted by where the horse is bred are not eligible for grading.
 Have post-race drug testing managed by a governmental authority.
 Follow rules for androgenic-anabolic steroids and non-steroidal anti-inflammatory drugs, allowing only Boldenone, Nandrolone, Stanozolol, and testosterone. (This is a minimum standard; some racing jurisdictions have even higher restrictions on medications)

In 2008, the Committee began requiring that toe grabs on the horseshoe, designed to improve traction, be no longer than 2 millimeters. This was in response to studies by Dr. Susan Stover showing that such toe grabs substantially increase the risk of catastrophic racing injuries. They have also discussed a phase-out on the race day use of furosemide (Lasix).

A newly established race may inherit the graded status of a discontinued race if it is held at the same facility under essentially identical conditions as the discontinued race. For example, the inaugural running of the Pegasus World Cup in January 2017 was Grade I, inheriting the status of the discontinued Donn Handicap.

Levels
There are four grade levels, from Listed at the bottom to Grade I at the top. The latter are higher-class races for bigger prizes for horses of the same age group (2, 3 or 3 and up) and may further be restricted by sex. The weight conditions of the races may vary provided they meet the Committee's standards to ensure competitiveness. Many grade I races are "weight-for-age", with weights adjusted only according to age and sex, and also there are "set weights" where all horses carry the same weight (usually applicable when all horses are of the same age and sex). Furthermore, there are "conditions" races, in which horses carry weights that are set by conditions, such as having won a certain number of races, or races of a certain value. Finally, some graded stakes are "handicaps", in which an official handicapper assigns weights to each horse in an attempt to equalize the competition.

Note that all Grade I races must have a purse of at least $300,000, but not all races with such high purses are Grade I. For example, the racetrack may be offering a high purse to attract better fields so the race will be upgraded in future years. The grade level is assigned by looking at data that indicates quality of the field for the last five years. In order to achieve or maintain a Grade I, it is necessary to attract a competitive field over a number of years.

For graded turf races, track conditions (normally excessive rain) may sometimes force the race to be run on the main (dirt) track. If this happens, the race is automatically downgraded by one grade level for that running only. The Committee then reviews the race within five days and may restore the original grade.  For example, a Grade I turf race that is switched to the dirt will be recorded as a Grade II race, unless the committee feels the quality of the race was sufficient to warrant Grade I.

In the United States and Canada, a graded race can be dormant for one year without losing its grade.

U.S. graded stakes races

Grade I changes since 2010

The following races have been downgraded from Grade I status since 2010:
 The Beldame Stakes at Belmont Park (2019)
 Blue Grass Stakes at Keeneland (2017)
Chandelier Stakes at Santa Anita (2020)
Charles Whittingham Memorial Stakes at Hollywood Park (2013)
 Eddie Read at Del Mar (2016)
 Gazelle Stakes at Aqueduct (2013)
Hollywood Turf Cup Stakes at Hollywood Park (2012)
 Las Virgenes at Santa Anita Park (2016)
 Los Alamitos Futurity at Los Alamitos (2019)
 Mother Goose Stakes at Belmont (2017)
Pat O'Brien Stakes at Del Mar (2012)
 Pimlico Special at Pimlico (2011)
 Prioress Stakes at Saratoga (2014)
Princess Rooney Handicap at Calder (2014)
Ruffian Handicap at Saratoga (2012)
Santa Anita Sprint Championship at Santa Anita (2020)
Santa Anita Oaks At Santa Anita (2020)
 Santa Margarita at Santa Anita (2019)
Santa Monica Stakes at Santa Anita (2013)
 Stephen Foster Handicap at Churchill Downs (2019)
 Triple Bend at Santa Anita (2019)
Vosburgh Stakes at Belmont Park (2020)
 Wood Memorial at Aqueduct (2017)
 Zenyatta Stakes at Santa Anita (2019)

The Hopeful Stakes was downgraded from grade I to grade II for 2012 but regained the top rating in 2013

The Donn Handicap was discontinued after its 2016 edition; its Grade I status was transferred to the Pegasus World Cup, which held its first edition in 2017

Delaware Handicap was upgraded to grade 1 status in 2013 but was downgraded back to grade 2 in 2018

The following races were upgraded to Grade I status since 2010:
Breeders' Cup Juvenile Fillies Turf (2012)
Breeders' Cup Juvenile Turf (2011)
Breeders' Cup Turf Sprint (2012)
 Churchill Downs Stakes (2019)
Cotillion Stakes at Parx Racing (2012)
 Fourstardave at Saratoga (2016)
 Jaipur Invitational at Belmont Park (2019)
Jenny Wiley Stakes at Keeneland (2012)
 La Troienne Stakes at Churchill Downs (2014)
 Pennsylvania Derby at Parx Racing (2017)
 Woody Stephens Stakes at Belmont Park (2019)
 Blue Grass Stakes at Keeneland (2019)

See also
Group One
List of horse races
List of American and Canadian Graded races

References

External links
Graded Stakes Database
Thoroughbred Owners and Breeders Association
An Explanation of the American Graded Stakes Process
Graded stakes committee to require adoption of steroid, toe grab rules 

Horse racing terminology